Timothy Earl Solomon (born August 5, 1961), known as Popin' Pete , is an American dancer, choreographer who popularized the "popping" dance style and member of the Electric Boogaloos. Pete’s career has spanned over forty years since the emergence of popping dance.

Biography
Being inspired by his older brother, “Boogaloo” Sam Solomon, who by that time had already mastered all existing street dance styles, Pete would always watch Sam dance and learn from him . Around the years 1975-1976 Sam would combine the local popping techniques & Boogaloo styles that originated in Oakland. He compiled a set of basic movements and founded The Electric Boogaloos.

The Electric Boogaloos
Popin’ Pete is a first generation member of The Electric Boogaloos, joining the group in 1978, Pete began to learn the popping style. According to Pete, he learned to pop first because Boogaloo was too difficult. Boogaloo Sam  as a creator of the group taught basics to the members of The Electric Boogaloos.  As all the members were very experienced and passionate dancers, the group soon became successful. During that time, Pete and the other members of The Electric Boogaloos appeared on many popular shows including: The Midnight Special, Kicks and Soul Train in the United States. (firstly in 1980).

Relationship with Michael Jackson
In 1982, Michael Jackson, after seeing their Soul Train performance, approached members of The Electric Boogaloos to choreograph both the "Thriller" and "Beat It" videos.
Their relationship with Jackson spanned almost two decades working in various roles — from numerous music videos (e.g. "Beat It", Captain EO & Michael Jackson's Ghosts) to multimedia movies, live performances, choreography, and lessons.

Popin' Pete in Chris Brown's "Yeah 3x"

One scene in "Yeah 3x" is dedicated to Popin' Pete who dances with Chris Brown at a storefront labeled "Popin Pete's" . Pete and Brown do a dance routine which was choreographed by Pete. Then they each go on with short dance solos.

Popin’ Pete in funk culture
Popin Pete has gone on to innovate styles/moves like crazy legs, ET, spider man and sleepy style. With Electric Boogaloos he performs on the most authoritative scenes spreading American funkstyles culture all over the world,  working alongside some of this generation's most dedicated and hard working music artists. Artists such as: Justin Timberlake, Gwen Stefani, Mýa, The Black Eyed Peas and Janet Jackson etc.
For 35 years Popin Pete and the Electric Boogaloos have been developing funk styles in the world. Popin Pete is invited as a judge to the dance competitions ("battles") in United Kingdom (UK Bboy Championship, Breakin' Convention), Europe, Japan (Dance Delight Japan, Old School Night), South Korea, China (Keep on dancing) etc. He is considered to be influential figure in street-dance culture. His students from the United States, Canada, UK, Europe, Brazil, Japan, China, South Korea, Russia call him "living legend". On January 25, 2012 the Electric Boogaloos were presented with special Life Time Achievement Award at The Carnival: Choreographer’s Ball 13 Year Anniversary Show.

References

External links
 Popin Pete official homepage 
 versions available between May 2013 and October 2016 via archive.org (captures after October 2016 do not represent original content)
 The Electric Boogaloos official homepage 
 versions available between May 1999 and November 2011 via archive.org (captures after November 2011 do not represent original content)

Living people
American male dancers
American choreographers
Popping dancers
Popping (dance)
1961 births
People from Fresno, California